Lagarde-Paréol is a commune in the Vaucluse department in the Provence-Alpes-Côte d'Azur region in southeastern France.

Name 
The settlement is attested as seignoriu de la Garda Pariol ca. 1180.

See also
Communes of the Vaucluse department

References

Communes of Vaucluse